Mac Papers, headquartered in Jacksonville, Florida, United States, is an industrial distributor of paper and printing supplies, packaging materials and equipment, facility supplies, and office products. The company is the largest supplier of printing paper and envelopes in the Southeast United States, delivering 100,000 tons of paper each year. The company also provides graphic supplies, wide format media and equipment, packaging solutions, and office supplies, as well as custom product and logistics solutions.

History
Clifford Graham McGehee founded the Jacksonville Paper Company in 1919. Frank McGehee and Tom McGehee, his sons, both worked in the family business, with Tom serving as president by 1956. The Jacksonville Paper Company was sold by the family in 1965, and the two brothers immediately started a new enterprise to target the printing and graphics industries. The brothers expanded the business throughout eight states in the southeast, establishing distribution centers and employing many family members. The company features products from the best paper manufacturers worldwide. Founder Tom McGehee died in 2002; brother Frank followed in 2006, but the company is still owned and operated by the McGehee family.
Frank's son David is currently president and Sutton is CEO; Tom's son Mac is executive vice president. Five members of the third generation are currently working in the business.

When Mac Papers opened in 1965, its slogan was "paper is all we do." While the company remains committed to its paper business, Mac Papers has diversified  its core business into four distinct segments: Paper & Print, Packaging, Facilities Supplies and Office Products.

In 2015, the company launched a website to celebrate its 50th year in business.

Business segments

Paper & Print: Mac Papers product line includes coated, uncoated, board, text and cover, writing, carbonless, pressure sensitive papers, digital papers, web papers and more. Mac Papers' sister company, Mac Papers Envelops Converters, uses equipment that produces envelopes in standard or specialty sizes for commercial and premium products. The line also has conventional graphic supplies and wide-format materials and equipment for the print community.

Packaging: Mac Papers packaging line consists of packaging materials, including corrugated, tapes and adhesives, shrink films, stretch films, strapping, cushioning and void fills, mailers and poly bags. The line also includes end-to-end equipment products, including corrugated automation, case sealers, stretch wrap equipment, shrink automation, baggers, cushioning systems, void fill systems, strapping equipment and coding and labeling and equipment.

Facility Supplies: Mac Papers facility supplies line contains general cleaning tools, restroom supplies, food service materials and safety supplies.

Office Products: Mac Papers office product line is composed of technology supplies and equipment, office supplies and office furniture to businesses.

Mac Papers Envelope Converters: As Mac Papers subsidiary founded in 1967, they manufacture commodity, proprietary and specialty envelopes and create custom-printed stock. On August 4, 2009, they announced the acquisition of the envelope division of Cardinal Unijax.

Community
The company donates 10% of pre-tax profits to charities and non-profit groups each year. Their employees and management also donate their time by serving as leaders of local organizations including churches, schools, the Chamber of Commerce, United Way and YMCA. The firm was named First Coast Company of the Year by the Jacksonville Business Journal in 1997. In 2003, Mac was again given the honor.

References

Manufacturing companies established in 1965
Companies based in Jacksonville, Florida
Manufacturing companies of the United States
Privately held companies based in Florida
Pulp and paper companies of the United States
1965 establishments in Florida